Elwyn station is a SEPTA Regional Rail station in Media, Pennsylvania. It was the former southern terminus of the SEPTA Media/Elwyn Line until its 2022 re-expansion to become the Media/Wawa Line.

In 2013, the station saw 510 boardings and 496 alightings on an average weekday. Service initially continued west to West Chester station, but was suspended in September 1986 due to poor track conditions. SEPTA service as far west as Wawa station was restored on August 21, 2022.

In 2009, SEPTA added 90 parking spaces to Elwyn station.

Prior to being named Elwyn, the station was known as Greenwood.

Station layout
Elwyn has two low-level side platforms with a connecting pathway across the tracks.

References

External links

Elwyn Station | SEPTA
Station from Google Maps Street View

SEPTA Regional Rail stations
Stations on the West Chester Line
Railway stations in Delaware County, Pennsylvania